Lerma is a town of Campeche Municipality, in the state of Campeche, south-eastern Mexico.

References

Populated places in Campeche